Yamoudou Camara (born 12 August 1987) is a French footballer who plays as a centre back.

Career

Although he never made his league debut for AS Nancy, Camara made two Cup appearances in the 2007–08 season.

In July 2008 Camara joined Birmingham City F.C on trial during their pre-season tour, training with the club and making a substitute appearance against Czech side FC Viktoria Plzeň.

In September 2010 he was released by AS Nancy and on 3 July he joined FK Ekranas. In December 2010 he was released by FK Ekranas and signed with Unirea Alba Iulia.

Politehnica Iași

In February 2012 Camara signed with Liga II club Politehnica Iaşi. After half a year at Politehnica, Camara helped his team gain promotion to the Liga I.

References

External links
 Player profile at FrenchLeague.com

1987 births
Living people
French footballers
French expatriate footballers
AS Nancy Lorraine players
FK Ekranas players
Liga II players
CSM Unirea Alba Iulia players
FC Politehnica Iași (2010) players
Expatriate footballers in Romania
French expatriate sportspeople in Romania
People from Sèvres
Association football defenders
Footballers from Hauts-de-Seine